Jōwa may refer to:

Japanese history

 Jōwa (Wala ka ana period) (DaWang2019)
 The Jōwa Incident (842)
 Jōwa (Muromachi period) (1345–1350)

People

 Hon'inbō Jōwa (1787–1847), a Japanese go player